Romerillo is a common name of Spanish origin for several plants and may refer to:

Abies guatemalensis, native to Central America
Asclepias linaria
Baccharis sarothroides
Bidens alba
Podocarpus glomeratus, native to Bolivia, Ecuador, and Peru
Suaeda nigra